St. Marys Bay French is a dialect of Acadian French spoken around St. Marys Bay, Nova Scotia, specifically in the region of Clare, Nova Scotia.  While sharing features with other dialects of Acadian French, it differs from these and other varieties of French in its morphology and phonology., and to a lesser extent its lexicon.

Situation 
The speakers of St. Marys Bay French live mostly in Digby County, Nova Scotia, in the villages of Church Point, Comeauville, Corberie, Grosses Coques, Meteghan, St-Bernard, Rivière du Saumon, and Saulnierville.  French has been spoken by a minority in this region for some time; in 1941, the number of Acadian French speakers in Digby County numbered 9,560, out of a total of 19,472 residents.  By the mid 1970s, the number of residents of Digby County reporting their mother tongue as French was 7,730, or 38% of the population.

Comparison with other varieties of French 

The phonemic inventory of Baie Sainte-Marie French is similar to the varieties of Acadian French spoken in Yarmouth County, to the south.  However, it has idiosyncratic vowel phonemes, for example /i e o u y œ/ have various diphthongised realisations, as do several nasal vowel phonemes.

A number of these correspondences are common outside of St. Marys Bay French and even Acadian French.

In popular culture
Grand Dérangement's song "" (from the album Dérangé) is sung in St. Marys Bay French.

Notes

References

Acadian culture
Acadian French
Digby County, Nova Scotia